Robik (ru: Арифметико Логическое Устройство «РОБИК») was a soviet ZX Spectrum clone produced between 1989 and 1994 by NPO Selto-Rotor in Cherkasy. 

It had the possibility to switch between Latin and Russian fonts. It had built-in Kempston interface and cursor keys that also worked as a joystick. 

It had no edge connector and video output was analog RGB on a 5-pin DIN or digital TTL on an 8-pin DIN for connecting to monochrome MDA/Hercules or color EGA monitor. There was no composite video and all I/O ports were 5- and 7-pin DINs. Inside the case there was a male 64-pin connector that could be mapped to the standard edge connector.

The hardware contained about three to four grams of gold and almost eighteen grams of silver. The letters on the keyboard were written using laser beam technology. The buttons used reed switches instead of copper or iron contact plates.

When writing, the screen memory to the TV/monitor screen did not begin from the top left of the border, but instead began from border right under paper. This meant that most multicolor effects and some games did not work correctly. Errors in the ROM have been fixed and Cyrillic letters were also inserted.

The keyboard matrix was extended from five keys in eight rows to five keys in nine rows to allow for more buttons. A reset could be performed by pressing two reset buttons.

The Robik came in four versions, with only minor changes made for Russian internationalization and localization. The hardware remained largely unchanged, but cheaper parts were used for each version. The fourth version had the new addition of a single integrated circuit. This version did not sell well because by then the main market for the Robik was hardware enthusiasts and this design did not allow for modifications.

Robik had two EPROM chips. There are two languages in the M2764AF-1 chip from ST, which can be switched by shortcut keys.

References

See also 

 List of ZX Spectrum clones
 Robic — programming language for 8–11 years old kids.

ZX Spectrum clones
Soviet computer systems